Troms Folkeblad is a newspaper published in Troms, Norway. Its main office is located in Finnsnes.

History and profile
Troms Folkeblad was first published on 15 November 1965. The paper is part of Polaris Media and is published by Harstad Tidende Gruppen AS, a subsidiary of Polaris Media. It covers the local communities Lenvik, Berg, Torsken, Tranøy, Sørreisa, Dyrøy, Salangen, Lavangen, Bardu and Målselv. The chief editor and publisher is Steinulf Henriksen.

The printed edition is published daily, except Sunday. The newspaper had 24,000 readers in 2007.

References

External links
www.folkebladet.no

1965 establishments in Norway
Newspapers published in Norway
Norwegian-language newspapers
Polaris Media
Publications established in 1965
Mass media in Troms